Ivie Anderson (sometimes Ivy) (January 16, 1904 – December 28, 1949) was an American jazz singer. Anderson was a member of the Duke Ellington Orchestra for more than a decade.

Personal life

Anderson was born on January 16, 1904, in Gilroy, California. Although her mother's name is unknown, her father was Jobe Smith. From 1914 to 1918 (age 9 to 13), Anderson attended St. Mary's Convent and studied voice. At Gilroy grammar school and Gilroy High School, she joined glee club and choral society. She also studied voice under Sara Ritt while in Nannie H. Burroughs Institution in Washington, D.C. From 1930 to 1945, Anderson lived at 724 East 52nd Place in Los Angeles, part of the 52nd Place Historic District.

Career 
Anderson's singing career began around 1921 with performances in Los Angeles. In 1924, she toured with the musical Shuffle Along. By 1925, she had performed in Cuba, the Cotton Club in New York City, and Los Angeles with the bands of Paul Howard, Curtis Mosby, and Sonny Clay. In 1928, she sang in Australia with Clay's band and starred in Frank Sebastian's Cotton Club in Los Angeles in April. Soon after, she began touring in the United States as a solo singer.

From 1930 to early 1931, with pianist Earl Hines's band, Anderson performed in a 20-week residency at the Grand Terrace in Chicago, Illinois. In 1931, she became the first full-time vocalist in the Duke Ellington orchestra. Her career for over a decade consisted of touring with Ellington. Her first appearance on record, "It Don't Mean a Thing (If It Ain't Got That Swing)", recorded in 1932, was a hit. She participated in Ellington's first European tour in 1933. In 1940, she recorded "Solitude", "Mood Indigo", and "Stormy Weather". One of the rare occasions Anderson sang independently of Ellington in this period was her performance of "All God's Children Got Rhythm" in the  Marx Brothers film A Day at the Races (1937) for MGM.

Owing to her chronic asthma, Anderson left Ellington's band in 1942. She started the Chicken Shack restaurant in Los Angeles with Marque Neal after they married but sold the business when they divorced. She had a second marriage with Walter Collins. At the end of 1949, Anderson died in Los Angeles. Although her earliest obituary was dated December 27, 1949, later sources state her date of death as December 28, 1949.

Comments about Ivie Anderson
Anderson often received prominent billing on advertisements for Ellington's appearances in theatres, auditoriums, arenas, and ballrooms, wherever the Ellington band toured in the 1930s. She sang pop tunes and ballads and was the band's scat singer, imitating instrumental sounds and vocalizations. She was said to be one of Ellington's finest and most versatile singers before Swedish vocalist Alice Babs performed with the band. Ellington wrote Music Is My Mistress (1973) with Anderson in mind.

When Anderson played in Ellington's musical Jump for Joy, the California Eagle wrote of her:"Ivie can sing a song so that the audience get every word, and at the same time make cracks at Sonny Greer, tease Duke and wink at the boys in the front row. Wednesday night she went into a dance routine that would have slayed you."

Discography
1932
"It Don't Mean a Thing (If It Ain't Got That Swing)" (Brunswick 6265) February 2, 1932
"Delta Bound" (Columbia 37298) December 21, 1932 (not issued until the 1940s)
1933
"I've Got the World on a String" (UK Columbia CB-625) February 15, 1933 (recorded in New York but only issued overseas)
 "Stormy Weather" 1933 quoted in Stuart Nicholson's book "Reminiscing in Tempo" page 131 
"Happy as the Day Is Long" (Brunswick 6571) May 9, 1933
"Raisin' the Rent" (Brunswick 6571) May 9, 1933
"Get Yourself a New Broom (and Sweep Your Blues Away)" (Brunswick 6607) May 9, 1933
"I'm Satisfied" (Brunswick 6638) August 15, 1933
1934
"Ebony Rhapsody" (Victor 24622) April 12, 1934
"Troubled Waters" (Victor 24651) May 9, 1934
"My Old Flame" (Victor 24651) May 9, 1934
1935
"Let's Have a Jubilee" (unissued on 78) January 9, 1935
"Cotton" (Brunswick 7525) August 19, 1935
"Truckin'" (Brunswick 7514) August 19, 1935
1936
"Dinah Lou" (unissued on 78) January 20, 1936
"Isn't Love the Strangest Thing?" (Brunswick 7625) February 27, 1936
"Love Is Like a Cigarette" (Brunswick 7627) February 28, 1936
"Kissin' My Baby Goodnight" (Brunswick 7627) February 28, 1936
"Oh Babe! Maybe Someday" (Brunswick 7667) February 28, 1936
"Shoe Shine Boy" (Brunswick 7710) July 17, 1936
"It Was a Sad Night in Harlem" (Brunswick 7710) July 17, 1936
1937
"I've Got To Be a Rug Cutter" (Master MA-101) March 5, 1937
"My Honey's Lovin' Arms" (as The Gotham Stompers) (Variety VA-629) March 25, 1937
"Did Anyone Ever Tell You?" (as The Gotham Stompers) (Variety VA-541) March 25, 1937
"Where Are You?" (as The Gotham Stompers) (Variety VA-541) March 25, 1937
(The Gotham Stompers session included members of Ellington's band plus members of Chick Webb's.)
"There's a Lull in My Life" (Master MA-117) April 9, 1937
"It's Swell of You" (Master MA-117) April 9, 1937
"The Old Plantation" (as Ivie Anderson And Her Boys From Dixie) (Variety VA-591) April 22, 1937
"All God's Chillun Got Rhythm" (as Ivie Anderson And Her Boys From Dixie) (Variety VA-591) June 8, 1937
"Alabamy Home" (Master VA-137) June 8, 1937
1938
"If You Were in My Place (What Would You Do?)" (Brunswick 8093) February 24, 1938
"Scrounch" (Brunswick 8093) February 24, 1938
"Carnival in Caroline" (Brunswick 8099) March 3, 1938
"Swingtime in Honolulu" (Brunswick 8131) April 11, 1938
"You Gave Me the Gate (and I'm Swingin')" (Brunswick 8169) June 7, 1938
"Rose of the Rio Grande" (Brunswick 8186) June 7, 1938
"When My Sugar Walks Down the Street" (Brunswick 8168) June 7, 1938
"Watermelon Man" (Brunswick 8200) June 20, 1938
"La De Doody Do" (Brunswick 8174) June 20, 1938
1939
"In a Mizz" (Brunswick 8405) June 12, 1939
"I'm Checkin' Out, Goo'm Bye" (Columbia 35208) June 12, 1939
"A Lonely Co-ed" (Columbia 35240) June 12, 1939
"You Can Count On Me" (Brunswick 8411) June 12, 1939
"Killing Myself" (Columbia 35640) October 16, 1939
"Your Love Has Faded" (Columbia 35640) October 16, 1939
1940
"Solitude" (Columbia 35427) February 14, 1940
"Stormy Weather" (Columbia 35556) February 14, 1940
"Mood Indigo" (Columbia 35427) February 14, 1940
"So Far, So Good" (Victor 26537) March 6, 1940
"Me and You" (Victor 26598) March 15, 1940
"At a Dixie Roadside Diner" (Victor 26719) July 22, 1940
"Five O'Clock Whistle" (Victor 26748) September 15, 1940
1941
"Chocolate Shake" (Victor 27531) June 26, 1941
"I Got It Bad (and That Ain't Good)" (Victor 27531) June 26, 1941
"Jump for Joy" (Victor LPV 517) July 2, 1941
"Rocks in My Bed" (Victor 27639) September 26, 1941
1942
"I Don't Mind" (Victor 20-1598) February 26, 1942
"Hayfoot, Strawfoot" (Victor 20-1505) July 28, 1942

Compilations
Duke Ellington Presents Ivie Anderson [1931–1940] (Columbia KG 32064 2-LP release) 1973
Her Best Recordings, 1932–1942 (Best Of Jazz 4020) 1995

Appearances on Ellington recordings
Duke Ellington
The Blanton–Webster Band [1940–1942] (RCA 5659-2-RB) 1990 
Ellington and His Great Vocalists (Columbia CK 66372) 1993

Charting singles

References

External links
 Ivie Anderson – American National Biography, Barry Kernfeld
 Musician Ivie Anderson (Vocal) All About Jazz
 Ivie Anderson – Music Biography, Credits and Discography AllMusic
 
 

1904 births
1949 deaths
People from Gilroy, California
20th-century African-American women singers
American women jazz singers
American jazz singers
Duke Ellington Orchestra members
Gilroy High School alumni
Jazz musicians from California
Exclusive Records artists